Josef Duchoslav (born March 21, 1967) is a former professional ice hockey right winger from Czechoslovakia. 

Duchoslav played 70 games in the Czechoslovak First Ice Hockey League for TJ Zetor Brno and 27 games in the Czech Extraliga for KLH Jindřichův Hradec and ASD Dukla Jihlava. He also played 16 games in the Tipsport Liga for MHC Martin.

References

External links

1967 births
Living people
Czech ice hockey right wingers
Czechoslovak ice hockey right wingers
HC Dukla Jihlava players
SHK Hodonín players
KLH Vajgar Jindřichův Hradec players
HC Kometa Brno players
MHC Martin players
HC Oceláři Třinec players
People from Hodonín
HC ZUBR Přerov players
HC Stadion Litoměřice players
Sportspeople from the South Moravian Region
Czech expatriate ice hockey players in Slovakia